The Rock 'n' Roll Years was a BBC television programme aired between 1985 and 1994. In a half-hour time slot the programme focused on a different year each week, starting with the year 1956 and ending with 1989.

The format of the programme, which was based on the BBC Radio 1 series 25 Years of Rock, was primarily of news clips with narrative subtitles set to music of the time with no presenters or voice-overs.  Archive footage of performers, mostly from BBC programmes such as Top of the Pops, was also featured.

For instance, the programme on 1960 featured the Sharpeville massacre, the Russians shooting down two US spy planes, the advent of stiletto heels and the election of John Kennedy to the White House, set to music by Adam Faith, Duane Eddy and the Rebels, Cliff Richard and the Shadows, the Everly Brothers and Roy Orbison.

The theme tune to The Rock 'n' Roll Years was a medley containing riffs from a number of popular songs, including for example "(I Can't Get No) Satisfaction" by The Rolling Stones and "Layla" by Derek and the Dominos. The first set of episodes covered the years 1956–63, and was aired over July and August 1985. The second set covered 1964–71, and aired between June and August 1986. The years 1972–80 were over the same period in 1987.

For the 1994 series, which covered 1981–89, a similar medley was created using extracts from 1980s hits such as "Like a Virgin" by Madonna, "Radio Ga Ga" by Queen, "Every Breath You Take" by the Police, "Do They Know It's Christmas?" by Band Aid and "The Look of Love" by ABC. These episodes were aired between February and April.

Series overview

List of episodes

Pilot

Series 1

Series 2

Series 3

Series 4

Similar formats
Other programmes with similar formats are:
History Rocks on The History Channel
Pop-up Video on VH1
Reeling in the Years on RTÉ
Siar Sna… on TG4
Pop Goes Northern Ireland on BBC Northern Ireland
Alba on BBC Alba
That's So... on Channel 5
Rewind on BBC Scotland
Don't Look Back in Anger on Virgin Media Four

Trivia

As part of his 1987 Christmas Special, Lenny Henry performed a spoof version of the show. He lampooned various artists including Mungo Jerry, Tina Turner and Michael Jackson.

Another version of the show appeared online only on the BBC's Doctor Who website in 2004, covering the adventures of the Doctor from the 1960s to the 1980s, using footage from the sci-fi series and accompanying music from each of the decades as per the regular format of the show.

References

External links 

BBC Television shows
Pop music television series
Nostalgia television shows
1984 British television series debuts
1994 British television series endings
1980s British music television series
1990s British music television series
English-language television shows
Cultural depictions of Indira Gandhi